Tukahur (also Romanized as Tūkahūr) is a village in Tukahur Rural District, Tukahur District, Minab County, Hormozgan Province, Iran. At the 2006 census, its population was 1,852, in 355 families.

References 

Populated places in Minab County